A high valley or high-level valley is a valley in the upper third of a mountain range. More loosely it can refer to any mountain valley.

Examples of high valleys are the Kathmandu Valley in the Himalayas at a height of 1,350 m, the Engadine and St. Moritz in the Swiss Alps at 1,856 metres and the Tannheimer Tal in Austria at 1,100 metres above sea level.

See also 
 Glen

References 

Valleys